

Events

Pre-1600
30 BC – Battle of Alexandria: Mark Antony achieves a minor victory over Octavian's forces, but most of his army subsequently deserts, leading to his suicide.
 781 – The oldest recorded eruption of Mount Fuji (Traditional Japanese date: Sixth day of the seventh month of the first year of the Ten'o (天応) era).
1009 – Pope Sergius IV becomes the 142nd pope, succeeding Pope John XVIII.
1201 – Attempted usurpation by John Komnenos the Fat for the throne of Alexios III Angelos.
1423 – Hundred Years' War: Battle of Cravant: A Franco-Scottish army is defeated by the Anglo-Burgundians at Cravant on the banks of the river Yonne.
1451 – Jacques Cœur is arrested by order of Charles VII of France.
1492 – All remaining Jews are expelled from Spain when the Alhambra Decree takes effect.
1498 – On his third voyage to the Western Hemisphere, Christopher Columbus becomes the first European to discover the island of Trinidad.

1601–1900
1618 – Maurice, Prince of Orange disbands the waardgelders militia in Utrecht, a pivotal event in the Remonstrant/Counter-Remonstrant tensions. 
1655 – Russo-Polish War (1654–67): The Russian army enters the capital of the Grand Duchy of Lithuania, Vilnius, which it holds for six years.
1658 – Aurangzeb is proclaimed Mughal emperor of India.
1703 – Daniel Defoe is placed in a pillory for the crime of seditious libel after publishing a politically satirical pamphlet, but is pelted with flowers.
1712 – Action of 31 July 1712 (Great Northern War): Danish and Swedish ships clash in the Baltic Sea; the result is inconclusive.
1715 – Seven days after a Spanish treasure fleet of 12 ships left Havana, Cuba for Spain, 11 of them sink in a storm off the coast of Florida. A few centuries later, treasure is salvaged from these wrecks.
1741 – Charles Albert of Bavaria invades Upper Austria and Bohemia.
1763 – Odawa Chief Pontiac's forces defeat British troops at the Battle of Bloody Run during Pontiac's War.
1777 – The U.S. Second Continental Congress passes a resolution that the services of Gilbert du Motier, Marquis de Lafayette "be accepted, and that, in consideration of his zeal, illustrious family and connexions, he have the rank and commission of major-general of the United States."
1790 – The first U.S. patent is issued, to inventor Samuel Hopkins for a potash process.
1856 – Christchurch, New Zealand is chartered as a city.
1865 – The first narrow-gauge mainline railway in the world opens at Grandchester, Queensland, Australia.
1874 – Dr. Patrick Francis Healy became the first African-American inaugurated as president of a predominantly white university, Georgetown University.

1901–present
1904 – Russo-Japanese War: Battle of Hsimucheng: Units of the Imperial Japanese Army defeat units of the Imperial Russian Army in a strategic confrontation.
1917 – World War I: The Battle of Passchendaele begins near Ypres in West Flanders, Belgium.
1932 – The NSDAP (Nazi Party) wins more than 38% of the vote in German elections.
1938 – Bulgaria signs a non-aggression pact with Greece and other states of Balkan Antanti (Turkey, Romania, Yugoslavia).
  1938   – Archaeologists discover engraved gold and silver plates from King Darius the Great in Persepolis.
1941 – The Holocaust: Under instructions from Adolf Hitler, Nazi official Hermann Göring orders SS General Reinhard Heydrich to "submit to me as soon as possible a general plan of the administrative material and financial measures necessary for carrying out the desired Final Solution of the Jewish question."
  1941   – World War II: The Battle of Smolensk concludes with Germany capturing about 300,000 Soviet Red Army prisoners.
1945 – Pierre Laval, the fugitive former leader of Vichy France, surrenders to Allied soldiers in Austria.
1948 – At Idlewild Field in New York, New York International Airport (later renamed John F. Kennedy International Airport) is dedicated.
1948 –  is sunk by an aerial torpedo after surviving hits from two atomic bombs (as part of post-war tests) and being used for target practice by three other ships.
1964 – Ranger program: Ranger 7 sends back the first close-up photographs of the moon, with images 1,000 times clearer than anything ever seen from earth-bound telescopes.
1966 – The pleasure cruiser MV Darlwyne disappeared off the Cornwall coast with the loss of all 31 aboard.
1970 – Black Tot Day: The last day of the officially sanctioned rum ration in the Royal Navy.
1971 – Apollo program: the Apollo 15 astronauts become the first to ride in a lunar rover.
1972 – The Troubles: In Operation Motorman, the British Army re-takes the urban no-go areas of Northern Ireland. It is the biggest British military operation since the Suez Crisis of 1956, and the biggest in Ireland since the Irish War of Independence. Later that day, nine civilians are killed by car bombs in the village of Claudy.
1973 – A Delta Air Lines jetliner, flight DL 723 crashes while landing in fog at Logan International Airport, Boston, Massachusetts killing 89.
1975 – The Troubles: Three members of a popular cabaret band and two gunmen are killed during a botched paramilitary attack in Northern Ireland.
1987 – A tornado occurs in Edmonton, Alberta, killing 27 people.
1988 – Thirty-two people are killed and 1,674 injured when a bridge at the Sultan Abdul Halim ferry terminal collapses in Butterworth, Penang, Malaysia.
1991 – The United States and Soviet Union both sign the START I Strategic Arms Reduction Treaty, the first to reduce (with verification) both countries' stockpiles.
1992 – The nation of Georgia joins the United Nations.
  1992   – Thai Airways International Flight 311 crashes into a mountain north of Kathmandu, Nepal killing all 113 people on board.
  1992   – China General Aviation Flight 7552 crashes during takeoff from Nanjing Dajiaochang Airport, killing 108.
1997 – FedEx Express Flight 14 crashes at Newark International Airport, injuring five.
1999 – Discovery Program: Lunar Prospector: NASA intentionally crashes the spacecraft into the Moon, thus ending its mission to detect frozen water on the Moon's surface.
2006 – Fidel Castro hands over power to his brother, Raúl.
2007 – Operation Banner, the presence of the British Army in Northern Ireland, and the longest-running British Army operation ever, comes to an end. 
2008 – East Coast Jets Flight 81 crashes near Owatonna Degner Regional Airport in Owatonna, Minnesota, killing all eight people on board.
2012 – Michael Phelps breaks the record set in 1964 by Larisa Latynina for the most medals won at the Olympics.
2014 – Gas explosions in the southern Taiwanese city of Kaohsiung kill at least 20 people and injure more than 270.

Births

Pre-1600
1143 – Emperor Nijō of Japan (d. 1165)
1396 – Philip III, Duke of Burgundy (d. 1467)
1526 – Augustus, Elector of Saxony (d. 1586)
1527 – Maximilian II, Holy Roman Emperor (d. 1576)
1595 – Philipp Wolfgang, Count of Hanau-Lichtenberg (d. 1641)
1598 – Alessandro Algardi, Italian sculptor (d. 1654)

1601–1900
1686 – Charles of France, Duke of Berry (d. 1714)
1702 – Jean Denis Attiret, French missionary and painter (d. 1768)
1704 – Gabriel Cramer, Swiss mathematician and physicist (d. 1752)
1718 – John Canton, English physicist and academic (d. 1772)
1724 – Noël François de Wailly, French lexicographer and author (d. 1801)
1759 – Ignaz Anton von Indermauer, Austrian nobleman and government official (d. 1796)
1777 – Pedro Ignacio de Castro Barros, Argentinian priest and politician (d. 1849)
1796 – Jean-Gaspard Deburau, Czech-French actor and mime (d. 1846)
1800 – Friedrich Wöhler, German chemist and academic (d. 1882)
1803 – John Ericsson, Swedish-American engineer, co-designed the USS Princeton and the Novelty Locomotive (d. 1889)
1816 – George Henry Thomas, American general (d. 1870)
1826 – Juhani Aataminpoika, Finnish serial killer (d. 1854)
  1826   – William S. Clark, American colonel and politician (d. 1886)
1835 – Henri Brisson, French lawyer and politician, 50th Prime Minister of France (d. 1912)
  1835   – Paul Du Chaillu, French-American anthropologist and explorer (d. 1903)
1836 – Vasily Sleptsov, Russian author and activist (d. 1878)
1837 – William Quantrill, American captain (d. 1865)
1839 – Ignacio Andrade, Venezuelan general and politician, 25th President of Venezuela (d. 1925)
1843 – Peter Rosegger, Austrian poet and author (d. 1918)
1847 – Ignacio Cervantes, Cuban pianist and composer (d. 1905)
1854 – José Canalejas, Spanish academic and politician, Prime Minister of Spain (d. 1912)
  1854   – Arthur Barclay, 15th president of Liberia (d. 1938)
1858 – Richard Dixon Oldham, English seismologist and geologist (d. 1936)
  1858   – Marion Talbot, influential American educator (d. 1948)
1860 – Mary Vaux Walcott, American painter and illustrator (d. 1940)
1867 – S. S. Kresge, American businessman, founded Kmart (d. 1966)
1875 – Jacques Villon, French painter (d. 1963)
1877 – Louisa Bolus, South African botanist and taxonomist (d. 1970)
1880 – Premchand, Indian author and playwright (d. 1936)
1883 – Ramón Fonst, Cuban fencer (d. 1959)
1884 – Carl Friedrich Goerdeler, Polish-German economist and politician (d. 1945)
1886 – Salvatore Maranzano, Italian-American mob boss (d. 1931)
  1886   – Fred Quimby, American animation producer (d. 1965)
1887 – Hans Freyer, German sociologist and philosopher (d. 1969)
1892 – Herbert W. Armstrong, American evangelist and publisher, founded Worldwide Church of God (d. 1986)
  1892   – Joseph Charbonneau, Canadian archbishop (d. 1959)
1894 – Fred Keenor, Welsh footballer (d. 1972)

1901–present
1901 – Jean Dubuffet, French painter and sculptor (d. 1985)
1902 – Gubby Allen, Australian-English cricketer and soldier (d. 1989)
1904 – Brett Halliday, American engineer, surveyor, and author (d. 1977)
1909 – Erik von Kuehnelt-Leddihn, Austrian theorist and author (d. 1999)
1911 – George Liberace, American violinist (d. 1983)
1912 – Bill Brown, Australian cricketer (d. 2008)
  1912   – Milton Friedman, American economist and academic, Nobel Prize laureate (d. 2006)
  1912   – Irv Kupcinet, American football player and journalist (d. 2003)
1913 – Bryan Hextall, Canadian ice hockey player (d. 1984)
1914 – Paul J. Christiansen, American conductor and composer (d. 1997)
  1914   – Louis de Funès, French actor and screenwriter (d. 1983)
1916 – Sibte Hassan, Pakistani journalist, scholar, and activist (d. 1986)
  1916   – Billy Hitchcock, American baseball player, coach, and manager (d. 2006)
  1916   – Bill Todman, American screenwriter and producer (d. 1979)
1918 – Paul D. Boyer, American biochemist and academic, Nobel Prize laureate (d. 2018)
  1918   – Hank Jones, American pianist, composer, and bandleader (d. 2010)
  1918   – Frank Renouf, New Zealand businessman and financier (d. 1998)
1919 – Hemu Adhikari, Indian cricketer (d. 2003)
  1919   – Curt Gowdy, American sportscaster and actor (d. 2006)
  1919   – Primo Levi, Italian chemist and author (d. 1987)
1920 – James E. Faust, American religious leader, lawyer, and politician (d. 2007)
1921 – Peter Benenson, English lawyer and activist, founded Amnesty International (d. 2005)
  1921   – Donald Malarkey, American sergeant and author (d. 2017)
  1921   – Whitney Young, American activist (d. 1971)
1922 – Hank Bauer, American baseball player and manager (d. 2007)
1923 – Ahmet Ertegun, Turkish-American songwriter and producer, founded Atlantic Records (d. 2006)
  1923   – Stephanie Kwolek, American chemist and engineer, invented Kevlar (d. 2014)
1924 – Jimmy Evert, American tennis player and coach (d. 2015)
1925 – Carmel Quinn, Irish singer, actress and writer (d. 2021)
  1925   – John Swainson, Canadian-American jurist and politician, 42nd Governor of Michigan (d. 1994)
1926 – Bernard Nathanson, American physician and activist (d. 2011)
  1926   – Hilary Putnam, American mathematician, computer scientist, and philosopher (d. 2016)
1927 – Peter Nichols, English author and playwright (d. 2019)
1928 – Bill Frenzel, American lieutenant and politician (d. 2014)
1929 – Lynne Reid Banks, English author
  1929   – Gilles Carle, Canadian director and screenwriter (d. 2009)
  1929   – Don Murray, American actor
  1929   – José Santamaría, Uruguayan footballer and manager 
1931 – Nick Bollettieri, American tennis player and coach (d. 2022) 
  1931   – Kenny Burrell, American singer-songwriter and guitarist
1932 – Ted Cassidy, American actor and screenwriter (d. 1979)
  1932   – John Searle, American philosopher and academic
1933 – Cees Nooteboom, Dutch journalist, author, and poet
1935 – Yvon Deschamps, Canadian comedian, actor, and producer
  1935   – Geoffrey Lewis, American actor and screenwriter (d. 2015)
1939 – Steuart Bedford, English pianist and conductor (d. 2021)
  1939   – Susan Flannery, American actress 
  1939   – France Nuyen, Vietnamese-French actress
1941 – Amarsinh Chaudhary, Indian politician, 8th Chief Minister of Gujarat (d. 2004)
1943 – William Bennett, American journalist and politician, 3rd United States Secretary of Education
  1943   – Lobo, American singer-songwriter and guitarist 
1944 – Geraldine Chaplin, American actress and screenwriter
  1944   – Jonathan Dimbleby, English journalist and author
  1944   – Sherry Lansing, American film producer
  1944   – Robert C. Merton, American economist and academic, Nobel Prize laureate
  1944   – David Norris, Irish scholar and politician
1945 – William Weld, American lawyer and politician, 68th Governor of Massachusetts
1946 – Gary Lewis, American pop-rock musician 
1947 – Karl Green, English bass player and songwriter
  1947   – Richard Griffiths, English actor (d. 2013)
  1947   – Mumtaz, Indian actress
  1947   – Hubert Védrine, French politician, French Minister of Foreign Affairs
  1947   – Ian Beck, English children's illustrator and author
1948 – Russell Morris, Australian singer-songwriter and guitarist
1949 – Mike Jackson, American basketball player
  1949   – Alan Meale, English journalist and politician
1950 – Richard Berry, French actor, director, and screenwriter
1951 – Evonne Goolagong Cawley, Australian tennis player
1952 – Chris Ahrens, American ice hockey player
  1952   – Alan Autry, American football player, actor, and politician, 23rd Mayor of Fresno, California
  1952   – Helmuts Balderis, Latvian ice hockey player and coach
  1952   – João Barreiros, Portuguese author and critic
  1952   – Faye Kellerman, American author
1953 – Ted Baillieu, Australian architect and politician, 46th Premier of Victoria
  1953   – Jimmy Cook, South African cricketer and coach
  1953   – Hugh McDowell, English cellist (d. 2018)
1954 – Derek Smith, Canadian ice hockey player
1956 – Michael Biehn, American actor, director, producer, and screenwriter
  1956   – Bill Callahan, American football player and coach
  1956   – Ron Kuby, American lawyer and radio host
  1956   – Deval Patrick, American lawyer and politician, 71st Governor of Massachusetts
  1956   – Lynne Rae Perkins, American author and illustrator
1957 – Daniel Ash, English singer-songwriter and guitarist 
  1957   – Mark Thompson, English business executive
1958 – Bill Berry, American drummer and songwriter
  1958   – Mark Cuban, American businessman and television personality
  1958   – Suzanne Giraud, French music editor and composer
1959 – Stanley Jordan, American guitarist, pianist, and songwriter
  1959   – Andrew Marr, Scottish journalist and author
  1959   – Kim Newman, English journalist and author 
1960 – Dale Hunter, Canadian ice hockey player and coach
  1960   – Malcolm Ross, Scottish guitarist and songwriter 
1961 – Frank Gardner, English captain and journalist
1961 – Sanusi Lamido Sanusi, Nigerian banker, royal
1962 – John Chiang, American lawyer and politician, 31st California State Controller
  1962   – Kevin Greene, American football player and coach (d. 2020)
  1962   – Wesley Snipes, American actor and producer
1963 – Norman Cook (Fatboy Slim), English DJ and musician
  1963   – Fergus Henderson, English chef and author
  1963   – Brian Skrudland, Canadian ice hockey player and coach
1964 – Jim Corr, Irish singer-songwriter and guitarist 
  1964   – Urmas Hepner, Estonian footballer and coach
1965 – Scott Brooks, American basketball player and coach
  1965   – John Laurinaitis, American wrestler and producer
  1965   – Ian Roberts, English-Australian rugby league player and actor
  1965   – J. K. Rowling, English author and film producer
1966 – Dean Cain, American actor, producer, and screenwriter
1967 – Tony Massenburg, American basketball player
  1967   – Tim Wright, Welsh composer
1968 – Saeed-Al-Saffar, Emirati cricketer
  1968   – Julian Richards, Welsh director and producer
1969 – Antonio Conte, Italian footballer and manager
  1969   – Loren Dean, American actor
  1969   – Kenneth D. Schisler, American lawyer and politician
1970 – Ahmad Akbarpour, Iranian author and poet
  1970   – Ben Chaplin, English actor
  1970   – Andrzej Kobylański, Polish footballer and manager
  1970   – Giorgos Sigalas, Greek basketball player, coach, and sportscaster
1971 – Gus Frerotte, American football player and coach
1973 – Nathan Brown, Australian rugby league player and coach
1974 – Emilia Fox, English actress
  1974   – Leona Naess, American-English singer-songwriter and guitarist
  1974   – Jonathan Ogden, American football player
1975 – Randy Flores, American baseball player and coach
  1975   – Andrew Hall, South African cricketer
  1975   – Gabe Kapler, American baseball player and manager
1976 – Joshua Cain, American guitarist and producer 
  1976   – Paulo Wanchope, Costa Rican footballer and manager
1978 – Zac Brown, American country singer-songwriter and guitarist 
  1978   – Nick Sorensen, American football player and sportscaster
  1978   – Justin Wilson, English race car driver (d. 2015)
1979 – Jaco Erasmus, South African-Italian rugby player
  1979   – J. J. Furmaniak, American baseball player
  1979   – Per Krøldrup, Danish footballer
  1979   – Carlos Marchena, Spanish footballer
  1979   – B. J. Novak, American actor, director, producer, and screenwriter
1980 – Mikko Hirvonen, Finnish race car driver
  1980   – Mils Muliaina, New Zealand rugby player
1981 – Titus Bramble, English footballer
  1981   – Vernon Carey, American football player
  1981   – Paul Whatuira, New Zealand rugby league player
1982 – Anabel Medina Garrigues, Spanish tennis player
  1982   – DeMarcus Ware, American football player
1985 – Daniel Ciofani, Italian footballer
  1985   – Rémy Di Gregorio, French cyclist
1986 – Evgeni Malkin, Russian ice hockey player
  1986   – Brian Orakpo, American football player
1987 – Michael Bradley, American soccer player
1988 – Alex Glenn, New Zealand rugby league player
1989 – Victoria Azarenka, Belorussian tennis player
1991 – Réka Luca Jani, Hungarian tennis player
1992 – José Fernández, Cuban-American baseball player (d. 2016)
  1992   – Ryan Johansen, Canadian ice hockey player
  1992   – Kyle Larson, American race car driver
1995 – Lil Uzi Vert, American hip hop artist
1998 – Rico Rodriguez, American actor
2002 – João Gomes, Brazilian singer

Deaths

Pre-1600
54 BC – Aurelia Cotta, Roman mother of Gaius Julius Caesar (b. 120 BC)
 450 – Peter Chrysologus, Italian bishop and saint (b. 380)
 910 – Feng Xingxi, Chinese warlord
 975 – Fu Yanqing, Chinese general  (b. 898)
1098 – Hugh of Montgomery, 2nd Earl of Shrewsbury
1358 – Étienne Marcel, French rebel leader (b. 1302)
1396 – William Courtenay, English archbishop and politician, Lord Chancellor of the United Kingdom (b. 1342)
1508 – Na'od, Ethiopian emperor 
1556 – Ignatius of Loyola, Spanish priest and theologian, founded the Society of Jesus (b. 1491)

1601–1900
1616 – Roger Wilbraham, Solicitor-General for Ireland (b. 1553)
1638 – Sibylla Schwarz, German poet (b. 1621)
1653 – Thomas Dudley, English soldier and politician, 3rd Governor of Massachusetts Bay Colony (b. 1576)
1693 – Willem Kalf, Dutch still life painter (b. 1619)
1726 – Nicolaus II Bernoulli, Swiss mathematician and theorist (b. 1695)
1750 – John V, king of Portugal (b. 1689)
1762 – Luis Vicente de Velasco e Isla, Spanish sailor and commander (b. 1711)
1781 – John Bligh, 3rd Earl of Darnley, British parliamentarian (b. 1719)
1784 – Denis Diderot, French philosopher and critic (b. 1713)
1805 – Dheeran Chinnamalai, Indian soldier (b. 1756)
1864 – Louis Christophe François Hachette, French publisher (b. 1800)
1875 – Andrew Johnson, American general and politician, 17th President of the United States (b. 1808)
1884 – Kiến Phúc, Vietnamese emperor (b. 1869)
1886 – Franz Liszt, Hungarian pianist, composer, and conductor (b. 1811)
1891 – Jean-Baptiste Capronnier, Belgian stained glass painter (b. 1814)

1901–present
1913 – John Milne, British geologist and mining engineer. (b. 1850)
1914 – Jean Jaurès, French journalist and politician (b. 1859)
1917 – Francis Ledwidge, Irish soldier and poet (b. 1881)
  1917   – Hedd Wyn, Welsh language poet (b. 1887)
1920 – Ion Dragoumis, Greek philosopher and diplomat (b. 1878)
1940 – Udham Singh, Indian activist (b. 1899)
1942 – Francis Younghusband, British Army Officer, explorer and spiritual writer (b.1863)
1943 – Hedley Verity, English cricketer and soldier (b. 1905)
1944 – Antoine de Saint-Exupéry, French pilot and poet (b. 1900)
1951 – Cho Ki-chon, North Korean poet (b. 1913)
1953 – Robert A. Taft, American soldier and politician (b. 1889)
1954 – Onofre Marimón, Argentinian race car driver (b. 1923)
1958 – Eino Kaila, Finnish philosopher and psychologist, attendant of the Vienna circle (b. 1890)
1964 – Jim Reeves, American singer-songwriter (b. 1923) 
1966 – Bud Powell, American pianist (b. 1924)
1968 – Jack Pizzey, Australian politician, 29th Premier of Queensland (b. 1911)
1971 – Walter P. Carter, American soldier and activist (b. 1923)
1972 – Paul-Henri Spaak, Belgian politician, 40th Prime Minister of Belgium, 1st President of the United Nations General Assembly (b. 1899)
1973 – Azumafuji Kin'ichi, Japanese sumo wrestler, the 40th Yokozuna (b. 1921)
1979 – Beatrix Lehmann, English actress and director (b. 1903)
1980 – Pascual Jordan, German physicist, author, and academic (b. 1902)
  1980   – Mohammed Rafi, Indian playback singer (b. 1924)
1981 – Omar Torrijos, Panamanian general and politician, Military Leader of Panama (b. 1929)
1985 – Eugene Carson Blake, American religious leader (b. 1906)
1986 – Chiune Sugihara, Japanese diplomat (b. 1900)
1987 – Joseph E. Levine, American film producer (b, 1905)
1990 – Albert Leduc, Canadian ice hockey player (b. 1902)
1992 – Leonard Cheshire, English captain and pilot (b. 1917)
1993 – Baudouin, King of Belgium (b. 1930)
2000 – William Keepers Maxwell Jr., American editor, novelist, short story writer, and essayist (b. 1908)
2001 – Francisco da Costa Gomes, Portuguese general and politician, 15th President of Portugal (b. 1914)
  2001   – Friedrich Franz, Hereditary Grand Duke of Mecklenburg-Schwerin (b. 1910)
2003 – Guido Crepax, Italian author and illustrator (b. 1933)
2004 – Virginia Grey, American actress (b. 1917)
2005 – Wim Duisenberg, Dutch economist and politician, 1st President of the European Central Bank (b. 1935)
2009 – Bobby Robson, English footballer and manager (b. 1933)
  2009   – Harry Alan Towers, English-Canadian screenwriter and producer (b. 1920)
2012 – Mollie Hunter, Scottish author and playwright (b. 1922)
  2012   – Alfredo Ramos, Brazilian footballer and coach (b. 1924)
  2012   – Gore Vidal, American novelist, screenwriter, and critic (b. 1925)
  2012   – Tony Sly, American musician, singer-songwriter (b. 1970)
2013 – Michael Ansara, Syrian-American actor (b. 1922)
  2013   – Michel Donnet, English-Belgian general and pilot (b. 1917)
  2013   – John Graves, American captain and author (b. 1920)
  2013   – Trevor Storer, English businessman, founded Pukka Pies (b. 1930)
2014 – Warren Bennis, American scholar, author, and academic (b. 1925)
  2014   – Nabarun Bhattacharya, Indian journalist and author (b. 1948)
  2014   – Jeff Bourne, English footballer (b. 1948)
  2014   – Wilfred Feinberg, American lawyer and judge (b. 1920)
2015 – Alan Cheuse, American writer and critic (b. 1940)
  2015   – Howard W. Jones, American surgeon and academic (b. 1910)
  2015   – Billy Pierce, American baseball player and sportscaster (b. 1927)
  2015   – Roddy Piper, Canadian wrestler and actor (b. 1954)
  2015   – Richard Schweiker, American soldier and politician, 14th United States Secretary of Health and Human Services (b. 1926)
2016 – Chiyonofuji Mitsugu, Japanese sumo wrestler, the 58th Yokozuna (b. 1955)
  2016   – Seymour Papert, South African mathematician (b. 1928)
2017 – Jeanne Moreau, French actress (b. 1928)
2018 – Tony Bullimore, British sailor & businessman (b. 1939)
2019 – Harold Prince, Broadway producer and director, who received more Tony awards than anyone else in history (b. 1928)
2020 – Alan Parker, English filmmaker (b. 1944)
2022 – Fidel V. Ramos, 12th President of the Philippines (b. 1928)
 2022 – Bill Russell, NBA Hall of Fame Player and Coach (b. 1934)

Holidays and observances
Christian feast day:
Abanoub 
Germanus of Auxerre
Ignatius of Loyola
Neot
July 31 (Eastern Orthodox liturgics)
Earliest day on which the Feast of Kamál (Perfection) can fall, while August 1 is the latest; observed on the first day of the eighth month of the Baháʼí calendar. (Baháʼí Faith) 
End of the Trinity term (sitting of the High Court of Justice of England)
Ka Hae Hawaiʻi Day (Hawaii, United States), and its related observance:
Sovereignty Restoration Day (Hawaiian sovereignty movement)
Martyrdom Day of Shahid Udham Singh (Haryana and Punjab, India)
Treasury Day (Poland)
Warriors' Day (Malaysia)

References

External links

 
 
 

Days of the year
July